Fontaine-en-Bray (literally Fontaine in Bray) is a commune in the Seine-Maritime department in the Normandy region in northern France.

Geography

Population

Places of interest
 The eleventh-century church of Saint-Sulpice.
 A sixteenth-century stone cross.

See also
Communes of the Seine-Maritime department

References

Communes of Seine-Maritime